Stanley Clark Bagg (23 December 1820 – 8 August 1873) was a Canadian landowner in Villeray, a district of Montreal. He owned the land that became Jarry Park.

References

External links
 
Biography at the Dictionary of Canadian Biography Online

1820 births
1873 deaths
People from Villeray–Saint-Michel–Parc-Extension